Eastlands is Tasmania's largest shopping centre; it is located on the eastern side of the Derwent River, in the shopping district of Rosny Park, and within the greater area of Hobart, Tasmania, Australia.

Eastlands contains two major discount department stores (Big W and Kmart, two major supermarkets: Coles, and Woolworths), along with approximately one hundred specialty stores, as well as a multi-level carpark. It is located adjacent to the Rosny Bus Ball.

The shopping centre was the first of its kind in Tasmania, and has seen many refurbishments over the years. It has recently opened its new mall (facing Rosny Hill Road), containing a renovated Kmart and seventeen specialty stores.

History
In 2016, a woman was arrested after attempting to rob the centre's JB Hifi store with armed a syringe. In 2021, a 30 year old man doused customers at the centre's Caltex petrol station in turpentine and attempted to set a woman on fire. He was sentenced to a two years suspended sentence after the judge accepted his plea of being influenced by drug induced psychosis. The centre sustained minor flood damage in 2021, when stormwater gutters overflowed, causing water to rush into the centre's food court and through the roofs of some shops.

References

External links
Eastlands Shopping Centre
http://vicinity.com.au/centres/our-centres/eastlands-shopping-centre

Shopping centres in Tasmania
Shopping malls established in 1965